The 2013 Buffalo Bills season was the franchise's 44th season in the National Football League and the first under head coach Doug Marrone. It was also the final season under the ownership of Ralph Wilson, who died in March 2014 at the age of 95. The team equaled their record from 2012 and missed the playoffs, increasing their playoff drought to 14 seasons. This was the first year of renewed leases on Ralph Wilson Stadium and for the Bills Toronto Series, both of which were signed in the preceding offseason. The Toronto series was originally set to expire in 2017, but was cancelled in December 2014; the lease on Ralph Wilson Stadium expires in 2022 and will presumably be the last agreement with the aging stadium, as the lease specifies that the process of exploring a new stadium begins during the lease period. The Bills also started the 2013 season with a new starting quarterback, first-round draft pick EJ Manuel, after previous starter Ryan Fitzpatrick refused a pay cut and was subsequently released.

2013 draft

Notes
 The Bills traded their first- and third-round selections (8th and 71st overall) to the St. Louis Rams in exchange for the Rams' first-, second-, third- and seventh-round selections (16th, 46th, 78th and 222nd overall).
 The Bills traded their original seventh-round selection (214th overall) to the Seattle Seahawks in exchange for quarterback Tarvaris Jackson.

Staff

Final roster

Schedule

Preseason

Regular season

Note: Intra-division opponents are in bold text.
 #  Indicates that the game was part of the Bills Toronto Series.

Game summaries

Week 1: vs. New England Patriots

Stephen Gostkowski kicked a 35-yard field goal with five seconds left to give the Patriots the win. 

With the loss, the Bills began the season 0–1.

Week 2: vs. Carolina Panthers

Buffalo trailed for most of their Week 2 game against the Panthers but took the lead with two seconds left after Stevie Johnson caught a 2-yard touchdown pass from EJ Manuel. Dan Carpenter kicked the extra point to give the Bills a 24–23 win.

With the win, Buffalo improved to 1–1.

Week 3: at New York Jets

With the loss, the Bills fell to 1–2.

Week 4: vs. Baltimore Ravens

The Bills defense intercepted Ravens quarterback Joe Flacco five times in this game, as Flacco completed only 50% of his passes. Despite the five turnovers, the game was still somewhat close, but the Bills won the game 23–20.

With the win, the Bills improved to 2–2.

Week 5: at Cleveland Browns

EJ Manuel left the game for the Bills with a knee injury, and was replaced by Jeff Tuel. The Bills had a 24–17 lead in the third quarter, but the Browns, who also lost quarterback Brian Hoyer, won the game with Brandon Weeden at the helm. T. J. Ward returned an interception 44 yards to seal the game. 

With the loss, the Bills fell to 2–3.

Week 6: vs. Cincinnati Bengals

The Bills trailed 24–10 in the fourth quarter, but came back to tie the game after Marquise Goodwin caught a 40-yard touchdown pass from Thad Lewis and force overtime. In the extra period, the Bills got the ball first, but were forced to punt after they went three-and-out. The Bengals returned the punt 39 yards to set them up in field goal range. A couple of plays later, Mike Nugent kicked the game winning 43-yard field goal.

With the tough loss, the Bills fell to 2–4.

Week 7: at Miami Dolphins

With the win, the Bills improved to 3–4.

Week 8: at New Orleans Saints

This marked the Bills' only game outside of the Eastern time zone during the 2013 season.

Week 9: vs. Kansas City Chiefs

With the loss, the Bills fell to 3–6.

Week 10: at Pittsburgh Steelers

With the loss, the Bills fell to 3–7.

Week 11: vs. New York Jets

With the win, the Bills improved to 4–7.

Week 13: vs. Atlanta Falcons
Bills Toronto Series

With the loss, the Bills fell to 4–8.

Week 14: at Tampa Bay Buccaneers

With the loss, the Bills fell to 4–9.

Week 15: at Jacksonville Jaguars

With the win, the Bills improved to 5–9, but were eliminated from playoff contention with the Miami Dolphins' win over the New England Patriots.

Week 16: vs. Miami Dolphins

With the win, the Bills improved to 6–9. This was also the last home game that the Bills didn't sell out. Since the next game (Week 17 against the Patriots), every Bills home game has been sold out.

Week 17: at New England Patriots

With the loss, the Bills ended their season at 6–10.

Standings

Division

Conference

References

External links

Buffalo
Buffalo Bills seasons
Buffalo